Wayne Memorial High School is a high school in Wayne, Michigan in Metro Detroit, on the corner of Glenwood Road and Fourth Street, sitting near the border of Wayne and its district partner Westland. It is a part of Wayne-Westland Community Schools. It serves portions of Wayne, Westland, Inkster, and Romulus.

Notable alumni
Notable alumni include Pat Sheridan, a former major league baseball player for the Detroit Tigers and Kansas City Royals, and Lorenzo Guess, who played both football and basketball collegiately at Michigan State University, and is currently a member of MSU’s football coaching staff.

Ginger Gilmour (born Virginia Hasenbein), artist, sculptor, author, and ex-wife of Pink Floyd guitarist David Gilmore
Gregory Jbarra, actor and singer best known for his role as Garrett Moore in the show Blue Bloods

References

External links

Wayne Memorial High School
School district website

Public high schools in Michigan
Schools in Wayne County, Michigan